Mark Mori is an American documentary filmmaker, television producer and screenwriter of documentary and reality television series and specials.

He produced and directed Bettie Page Reveals All,  the authorized documentary film on life of pin-up model, Bettie Page, released in 2012.  Previously, Mori produced and directed Building Bombs, Academy Award nominee for Best Feature Documentary for 1990 (DVD release by Docurama/New Video in 2005), executive produced Blood Ties: The Life and Work of Sally Mann, documentary short Academy Award nominee for 1993; received an Emmy Award for the television documentary special, Kent State, the Day the War Came Home for 2000; co-produced The Fire This Time, 1994 Sundance Film Festival, Grand Jury Prize nominee and 1995 WGA TV Documentary, Current Events Award nominee  and in 2000, executive produced and directed, the investigative TV documentary, Wayne Williams and the Atlanta Child Murders for Court TV. Mori also founded the production company Single Spark Pictures in 1996.

Film

Building Bombs
Mori's first documentary film Building Bombs had a limited theatrical release in 1989. It was nominated for a 1990 Academy Award and was re-released in 1991. Mori produced and directed the film with Susan J. Robinson. Narrated by Jane Alexander, the film documents the Savannah River Plant nuclear bomb factory in Aiken, South Carolina which was used to make vast quantities of fissile material for the United States nuclear arsenal.

Blood Ties: The Life and Work of Sally Mann
Blood Ties: The Life and Work of Sally Mann is a 1994 short subject documentary film directed by Steven Cantor. It was nominated for an Academy Award for Best Documentary Short Subject.

Kent State: The Day the War Came Home
Kent State: The Day the War Came Home, directed by Chris Triffo and executive produced by Mark Mori featured interviews with injured students, eyewitnesses, guardsmen, and relatives of students killed at Kent State shootings on May 4, 1970. It was released by The Learning Channel (TLC) in 2000 and received the Emmy award for Outstanding Background/Analysis of a Single Current Story.

Television series

Raw Footage
Raw Footage was the first original series on The Independent Film Channel (IFC) hosted Alec Baldwin featuring interviews with independent film directors.

References

External links

IMDB: Bettie Page Reveals All
IMDB: The Fire This Time
IMDB: Single Spark Pictures

Living people
American documentary filmmakers
Kent State shootings
Year of birth missing (living people)